Maurice Riordan (born 1953) is an Irish poet, translator, and editor.

Born in Lisgoold, County Cork, his poetry collections include: A Word from the Loki (1995), a largely London-based collection which was a Poetry Book Society Choice and shortlisted for the T. S. Eliot Prize; Floods (2000) which took a more millennial tone, and was shortlisted for the Whitbread Poetry Award; The Holy Land (2007) which contains a sequence of Idylls or prose poems and returns to Riordan's Irish roots more directly than his earlier work.  It received the Michael Hartnett Award.

His anthologies include A Quark for Mister Mark: 101 Poems about Science (2000),  a collaboration with Jon Turney, an anthology of ecological poems Wild Reckoning (2004) edited with John Burnside, and Dark Matter (2008) edited with astronomer Jocelyn Bell Burnell.  He has also edited a selection of poems by Hart Crane (2008) in Faber's 'Poet to Poet' series.

He has translated the work of Maltese poet Immanuel Mifsud. His collection for children The Moon Has Written You a Poem is adapted from the Portuguese of José Jorge Letria.

In 2004 he was selected as one of the Poetry Society's 'Next Generation' poets. He was Poetry Editor of Poetry London from 2005 to 2009  and Editor of The Poetry Review from 2013 to 2017.

Riordan was educated in St. Colman's College, Fermoy, University College Cork and McMaster University, Ontario, Canada.

He has taught at Goldsmiths College and at Imperial College and is Emeritus Professor of Poetry at Sheffield Hallam University.  He lives in London.

Publications

Poetry collections 

A Word from the Loki, Faber 1995

Floods, Faber 2000

The Holy Land, Faber 2007

The Water Stealer, Faber 2013

Shoulder Tap, Faber 2021

For children 

The Moon Has Written You a Poem, Winged Chariot 2005

As editor 

A Quark for Mister Mark (with Jon Turney), Faber 2000

Wild Reckoning (with John Burnside), Calouste Gulbenkian Foundation 2004

The Best of Irish Poetry (with Colm Breathnach), Southword 2006

Dark Matter: Poems of Space (with Jocelyn Bell Burnell), Calouste Gulbenkian Foundation 2008

Hart Crane: Selected Poems, Faber 'Poet to Poet' 2008

The Finest Music: Early Irish Lyrics in Translation, Faber 2014

Translations 

Confidential Reports (Immanuel Mifsud), Southword 2005

The Play of Waves (Immanuel Mifsud), Arc 2017

References

External links

Maurice Riordan recording on The Poetry Archive
Maurice Riordan guest on BBC's Private Passions
Maurice Riordan author page on the Faber & Faber website
"Maurice Riordan" at Poetry Foundation

1953 births
Living people
Irish poets
People from County Cork
20th-century Irish writers
20th-century male writers
21st-century Irish writers
21st-century Irish male writers
Alumni of University College Cork